The St. Thomas Church (German: Thomaskirche) is a Lutheran church in Leipzig, Germany, located at the western part of the inner city ring road in Leipzig's district Mitte. It is associated with several well-known composers such as Richard Wagner and Felix Mendelssohn Bartholdy, and especially Johann Sebastian Bach, who worked here as a Kapellmeister (music director) from 1723 until his death in 1750. Today, the church also holds his remains. Martin Luther preached here in 1539.

Although rebuilt over the centuries and damaged by Allied incendiary bombs in 1943, the church today mainly retains the character of a late-Gothic hall church. The Thomanerchor, the choir of the Thomaskirche, likely founded in 1212, retains a well-known boys' choir.

History
There has been a church at the current site of the Thomaskirche at least since the 12th century. Foundations of a Romanesque building have been discovered in the choir and crossing of the current church.
 
Between 1212 and 1222 the earlier structure became the church of the new St. Thomas Monastery (Stift) of the Augustinian order founded by Markgraf Dietrich von Meissen. This monastery later became the core of the University of Leipzig (founded in 1409).

In 1217, The Minnesinger, or troubadour (see Minnesang), Heinrich von Morungen bequeathed to the church a relic of St. Thomas as he entered the order of canons after a trip to India.

In 1355, the Romanesque choir was changed to Gothic style. Following an inflow of wealth into Leipzig from the discovery of silver in the Erzgebirge, the Romanesque nave was demolished and replaced in 1482–96 by the current late-Gothic hall church.

The current building was consecrated by Thilo of Trotha, the Bishop of Merseburg, on 10 April 1496. During the Protestant Reformation it was converted from Roman Catholicism to Lutheranism.  The reformer Martin Luther preached here on Pentecost Sunday in 1539. The monastic buildings were demolished in 1541 following the monastery's dissolution.

The current church tower was first built in 1537 and rebuilt in 1702. Chapels added in the 17th century and an ante-building along the northern front of the nave with two stairways were removed at the end of the 19th century.

The composer Johann Sebastian Bach was choir director of music at St. Thomas Church from 1723 until his death in 1750 and taught at its affiliated school. A statue of Johann Sebastian Bach by the Leipzig sculptor Carl Seffner that stands next to the church was dedicated in 1908.

Wolfgang Amadeus Mozart played the organ at the church on one of his European tours in 1789.  In 1806, the church served as a munitions depot for the French army. During the Battle of Leipzig, the Thomaskirche was used as a military hospital.

Richard Wagner was baptized here on 16 August 1813. In 1828, he studied piano and counterpoint with the then Thomaskantor, Christian Th. Weinlig.

Most of the Baroque internal trappings of the church known to Bach were removed in a Gothic revival renovation of 1884–9. Also from this period date the pulpit and the main portal in the west facade.

On 4 December 1943, the tower was damaged in an Allied bombing raid on Leipzig, requiring repair. The authorities demolished the Johanneskirche, also damaged by bombs in 1943, in 1949 and the remains of Johann Sebastian Bach were moved from there to the Thomaskirche in 1950.

In the 20th century, sulfur emitted from nearby coal mines, and other pollutants in the atmospheric air caused the deterioration of exterior stonework and statuary, and even of interior Gothic paintings. In addition, the roof structure suffered from damage due to insects and moisture. For these reasons, the church was listed in the 2000 World Monuments Watch by the World Monuments Fund. Repairs were swiftly undertaken with financial support from the Fund and from American Express.

Repairs on the church in 1961 to 1964 also attempted to emphasize the Gothic hall church character of the building. Another renovation followed in 1991.

From 1993 to 2014, a 15th-century Gothic altar (originally in the Paulinerkirche, the church of the University of Leipzig, destroyed in 1968 by the Communist authorities) was located in the Thomaskirche. It was moved to the new St. Pauli church (2014) and replaced in 2016 with a Gothic-revival altar by Constantin Lipsius made in 1888, which had been removed in 1964.

A statue of Felix Mendelssohn Bartholdy, who lived in Leipzig from 1835 until his death in 1847, was dedicated on 18 October 2008, when it was re-erected opposite the St. Thomas Church on the occasion of the year of his 200th birthday. The  statue depicts the former Gewandhaus Orchestra director and composer in bronze. Celebratory speeches were given by Kurt Masur, also a former Gewandhaus Orchestra director, and Burkhard Jung, mayor of Leipzig. The original statue designed by Werner Stein was first dedicated on 26 May 1892. It had been located on the east side of the Gewandhaus until 9 November 1936, when it was taken down by the Nazis because of the composer's Jewish background.

Description
The churches measures 76 meters in length, of which the nave accounts for 50 meters. The nave is 25 meters wide and its walls reach a maximum height of 18 meters. The church's roof is unusually steep with a roof pitch of 63 degrees. It rises to a crown that is 45 meters high. The tower is 68 meters in height.

Works of art
The church features a number of works of art, including a baptismal font (1614–5) made by Franz Döteber and Portraits show the Stadtsuperintenden of Leipzig, the oldest dating from 1614. A crucifix made by Caspar Freidrich Löbel is one of the few remaining pieces from the times of Bach. The church also contains a number of notable epitaphs, such as the one for the knight Harras (d. 1451) and for councilor Daniel Leicher (1612). The colored windows in the choir were added after 1889. They show a number of historic motives: a memorial to the fallen of World War I, King Gustavus Adolphus of Sweden, Johann Sebastian Bach, Martin Luther with Elector Friedrich der Weise and Philip Melanchthon as well as Emperor Wilhelm I.

Tomb of Johann Sebastian Bach
The remains of Johann Sebastian Bach have been buried in the Thomaskirche since 1950. After his death on 28 July 1750, Bach was laid to rest in the hospital cemetery of the Johanniskirche in Leipzig. With the start of the Bach renaissance in the 19th century, the public started to become interested in his remains and their whereabouts. In 1894, the anatomy professor Wilhelm His was commissioned to identify the composer's remains amongst disinterred bones from the cemetery where Bach had been buried. He concluded that "the assumption that the bones of an elderly man, which had been found in an oak coffin near the Johanneskirche, were the remains of Johann Sebastian Bach" (translated from German) was very likely. On 16 July 1900 the bones were placed into a stone sarcophagus underneath the Johanniskirche.

Following the bombardment of the Johanniskirche on 4 December 1943, the bones were transferred to the Thomaskirche. The new grave with a bronze cover was inaugurated on 28 July 1950, 200 years after the death of the composer, who is now buried in the sanctuary of the Thomaskirche.

Organs
Another notable feature of the Thomaskirche is that it contains two pipe organs. The older one is a Romantic organ by Wilhelm Sauer, built from 1884 to 1889. Since this organ was considered "unsuitable" for Bach's music, a second organ was built in 1966/7 (by the Alexander Schuke Potsdam Orgelbau company). This was later replaced in 1999/2000 by a new organ, built by Gerald Woehl's organ building company from 1999 to 2000. This "Bach organ" was designed to look similar to the instrument on which Bach had played in the Paulinerkirche.

Church bells
The two belfries of the tower hold eight bells with a total weight of 10.8 tons. The largest and most precious bell is the Gloriosa, made in 1477 by Theodericus Reinhard; it is rung only on solemnities. Its famous incised drawings were created by Nikolaus Eisenberg. The second bell, Mittelglocke (midbell), was cast in 1574 by Wolf Hilliger, and the so-called Mönchs- oder Beichtglocke (monk's or confessional bell) founded in 1634 by Jakob König, which also strikes the hours. The smallest of the historical bells is the Gebetsglocke (prayer's bell), a work by the master Christophorus Gros from 1585. A clock bell in the lantern of the tower strikes the quarters. In 2020/21 the aforementioned bells were refurbished. Also four new bells were created in the Bachert bell foundry with inscriptions that reflect words from the motets by Johann Sebastian Bach. On Reformation Day 2021, all eight bells rang out together for the first time.

Choir
The Thomanerchor, the choir of the Thomaskirche, was founded in 1212 and is one of the oldest and most famous boys' choirs in Germany. It is headed by the Thomaskantor, an office that has been held by many well-known composers and musicians, including Johann Sebastian Bach from 1723 until his death in 1750.

Gallery

References

External links

 Official parish page
  Entry in the "Leipzig encyclopedia"
  Thomaskirche, in: Stadt Leipzig, Dezernat Stadtentwicklung und Bau (Hrsg.), Leipzig-Innenstadt. Städtebaulicher Denkmalschutz 1994-2017, Beiträge zur Stadtentwicklung (Blaue Reihe), issue 61, o.J., p. 26 f.

Thomas
Buildings and structures completed in 1496
Leipzig
Leipzig Thomas Church
Leipzig Thomas Church
Leipzig Thomas Church
Leipzig Thomas Church
Johann Sebastian Bach
Leipzig Thomas
Leipzig Thomas Church
St. Thomas School, Leipzig